Bernecebaráti is a village in Pest county, Hungary.

Notable people
Vilmos Füredi (born 1947), film director and producer

References

Populated places in Pest County